Two ships of the United States Navy have been named USS Antona:

 , an iron-hulled British screw steamer built at Glasgow and captured by the U.S. Navy
 , an unclassified vessel of the United States Navy

United States Navy ship names